Panayiotis Kythreotis (born 19 August 1980) is a former Cypriot football player, who played as a goalkeeper. He has also played for Aris Limassol, ASIL Lysi, APOEL and Chalkanoras Idaliou.

Honours
AEK Larnaca
 Cypriot Cup: 2003–04

References

Cypriot footballers
APOEL FC players
AEK Larnaca FC players
Living people
1980 births
ASIL Lysi players
Association football goalkeepers